Boffa Island is a rocky, ridge-like Antarctic island,  long, lying half a kilometre east of Browning Peninsula between Bosner and Birkenhauer Islands, in the south part of the Windmill Islands. It was first mapped by USN Operation Highjump and Operation Windmill in 1947 and 1948. Named by the US-ACAN for W. C. Boffa, observer with the then Army Strategic Air Command (SAC), who assisted Operation Windmill parties in establishing astronomical control stations in the area in January 1948.

See also 
 Composite Antarctic Gazetteer
 List of Antarctic and sub-Antarctic islands
 List of Antarctic islands south of 60° S
 SCAR
 Territorial claims in Antarctica

References

External links 

Windmill Islands